In ecology, a mesic habitat is a type of habitat with a moderate or well-balanced supply of moisture, e.g., a mesic forest, a temperate hardwood forest, or dry-mesic prairie. Mesic is one of a triad of terms used to describe the amount of water in a habitat. The others are xeric and hydric.

Further examples of mesic habitats include streamsides, wet meadows, springs, seeps, irrigated fields, and high elevation habitats. These habitats effectively provide drought insurance as land at higher elevations warms due to seasonal or other change.

Healthy mesic habitats act like sponges in that they store water in such a way that it can be deposited to neighboring habitats as needed. They are common in dryer regions of the western United States, and can be a good water source to neighboring desert habitats. Healthy mesic habitats also provide forb and insects for organisms belonging to higher trophic levels, such as grouse. 

Mesic habitats are under stress from various human activities such as ranching, however many conservation efforts are underway. As of 2010, over 1,474 ranchers have agreed to partner with the Sage Grouse Initiative under the U.S. Department of Agriculture in order to protect over 5.6 million acres of mesic habitat.

See also 
 Tugai

References 

Habitat